Lethbridge-East is a provincial electoral district in Alberta, Canada, covering the eastern half of the city of Lethbridge. The district is one of 87 in the province mandated to return a single member to the Legislative Assembly of Alberta using the first past the post method of voting.

The electoral district was created in the 1971 boundary redistribution when the old Lethbridge district was split into this district and Lethbridge-West.

The current representative for Lethbridge-East is United Conservative Nathan Neudorf, who won his first term on April 16, 2019. Prior to him it was held by New Democrat Maria Fitzpatrick, from 2015 to 2019, Liberal-turned-PC Bridget Pastoor from 2004 to 2015 and Liberal Ken Nicol from 1993 to 2004. Progressive Conservatives and Social Credit representatives have also held this district in the past.

History
The electoral district was created in the 1971 boundary redistribution when the old electoral district of Lethbridge  was split in half.

The 2010 boundary redistribution made some minor revisions to equalize the population between West and East. North of St. Edward Blvd the boundary was pushed west from 13 Street to Stafford Drive.

Boundary history

Representation history

The electoral district was created in the 1971 boundary redistribution. The first election that year saw a hotly contested race between Social Credit candidate John Anderson and Progressive Conservative candidate Richard Barton. Anderson won by just under a thousand votes to pick up the new seat for his party despite Social Credit losing government that year.

Anderson would be defeated in the 1975 general election by Archibald Johnston who won in a landslide. He would be appointed to the provincial cabinet by Premier Peter Lougheed after the election. He was re-elected to his second term in the 1979 election with a smaller majority.

The 1982 general election saw Johnston win the biggest majority of his career and the history of the district. He was re-elected to a fourth term in the 1986 general election and a fifth term in the 1989 general election. He held a cabinet post until 1992 when Ralph Klein became Premier. He retired at dissolution of the assembly in 1993.

The 1993 general election saw Liberal candidate Ken Nicol elected here in a closely contested race. Nicol won re-election in 1997 with a larger majority. He held his seat for a third term in the 2001 election and became Liberal leader later that year. Nicol resigned on May 25, 2004, to run for a seat to the House of Commons of Canada in the 2004 Canadian federal election.

The 2004 election saw Liberal candidate Bridget Pastoor win a closely contested race over Rod Fong to hold the district for her party. She was re-elected in 2008 as a Liberal, but crossed the floor to the Tories in 2011 and was reelected as a Tory in 2012. In 2015, Pastoor announced she would not seek re-election in the 2015 general election.

The 2015 election saw Maria Fitzpatrick of the NDP elected as MLA for Lethbridge-East. However, she was defeated after one term in office by Nathan Neudorf of the United Conservative Party on April 16, 2019.

Legislature results

1971 general election

1975 general election

1979 general election

1982 general election

1986 general election

1989 general election

1993 general election

1997 general election

2001 general election

2004 general election

2008 general election

2012 general election

2015 general election

2019 general election

Senate nominee results

2004 Senate nominee election district results
Voters had the option of selecting 4 Candidates on the Ballot

2012 Senate nominee election district results

Student Vote results

2004 election

On November 19, 2004, a Student Vote was conducted at participating Alberta schools to parallel the 2004 Alberta general election results. The vote was designed to educate students and simulate the electoral process for persons who have not yet reached the legal majority. The vote was conducted in 80 of the 83 provincial electoral districts with students voting for actual election candidates. Schools with a large student body that reside in another electoral district had the option to vote for candidates outside of the electoral district then where they were physically located.

2012 election

References

External links 
 Website of the Legislative Assembly of Alberta

Alberta provincial electoral districts
Politics of Lethbridge